John Bradbury, 2nd Baron Bradbury, of Winsford in the County of Chester (7 January 1914 – 31 March 1994) was a British peer and member of the House of Lords, the second holder of the title Baron Bradbury.

The son of John Bradbury, 1st Baron Bradbury GCB, Permanent Secretary to HM Treasury, by his marriage to Hilda, a daughter of W. A. Kirby, he was born on 7 January 1914 and baptized two months later at St Clement Danes, Westminster. He was educated at Cothill House, Westminster School, and Brasenose College, Oxford.

In 1939 he married firstly, 1939, Joan Knight, of Addlestone, Surrey, and they had one son and one daughter. In 1946 he married secondly Gwerfyl Roberts, one daughter. In 1950 he succeeded his father as Baron Bradbury.
Bradbury died on 31 March 1994, while living at Engomi, near Nicosia, Cyprus. The peerage was inherited by his only son, John (born 17 March 1940).

Arms

References

1914 births
1994 deaths
People educated at Cothill House
People educated at Westminster School, London
Alumni of Brasenose College, Oxford
2
People from Winsford